Strach się bać is an album released on 28 May 2007 by Polish rock band Lady Pank.

Track listing
 Strach się bać
 Wenus, Mars
 Jeśli coś tam kochasz
 Wspinaczka (czyli historia pewnej rewolucji)
 Leprechaun
 Naprawdę piękny dzień
 Pole minowe
 Dobra konstelacja
 Wielki supermarket
 Nie mam nic, prócz ciebie

Musicians

Lady Pank 
 Jan Borysewicz – guitar, backing vocals
 Janusz Panasewicz – lead vocals
 Krzysztof Kieliszkiewicz – bass
 Kuba Jabłoński – drums

Others 
 Wojtek Olszak - keyboards (some tracks)
 Michał Sitarski - rhythm guitar (some tracks)
 Mariusz Georgia Pieczara - backing vocals (some tracks)

External links 
Video clip

Lady Pank albums
2007 albums